There are a number of Anglican cathedrals in Canada. The Anglican Church of Canada is an ecclesiastical province of the Anglican Communion. Cathedrals are typically, though not always, the central church for the dioceses of the Anglican Church of Canada.

List

See also
 List of Anglican churches
 List of Anglican churches in Toronto
 List of cathedrals in Canada

Notes

References

 
Cathedrals, Anglican
Canada, Anglican